Zhaozhuang Bridge is a 410 metre long arch bridge currently under construction in Xingyi, in the Guizhou province of China. When it is completed it will be the highest arch bridge in the world. It will rank among the 20 highest bridges of any type and be among the 20 longest arch bridges. The bridge crosses the Maling River Canyon. The Maling River is a tributary of the Nanpan River.

The bridge will carry three lanes of traffic in each direction, the double tracks of a light rail line on the Xingyi Metro, and two pedestrian walkways on either side of the bridge. The bridge will be 40 metres wide.

See also
Maling River Shankun Expressway Bridge

External links
http://www.highestbridges.com/wiki/index.php?title=Malinghe_Bridge_Zhaozhuang

Arch bridges in China
Buildings and structures under construction in China
Bridges in Guizhou
Bridges under construction
Cable-stayed bridges in China
Xingyi, Guizhou
Qianxinan Buyei and Miao Autonomous Prefecture